Inge of Norway may refer to:
Inge I of Norway
Inge II of Norway
Inge Magnusson